Anti-Dühring ("Herr Eugen Dühring's Revolution in Science") is a book by Friedrich Engels, first published in German in 1878. It had previously been serialised in the newspaper Vorwärts. There were two further German editions in Engels' lifetime. Anti-Dühring was first published in English translation in 1907.

Contents
This work was Engels's major contribution to the exposition and development of Marxist theory. Its full title translates as Herr Eugen Dühring's Revolution in Science: this is meant ironically and polemically. The short title recalls Julius Caesar's polemic Anti-Cato.

Eugen Dühring had produced his own version of socialism, intended as a replacement for Marxism. Since Karl Marx was busy at the time with writing Das Kapital, it was left to Engels to write a general defence.  The sections are Philosophy, Political Economy and Socialism.

Among Communists, it is a popular and enduring work which, as Engels wrote to Marx, was an attempt "to produce an encyclopaedic survey of our conception of the philosophical, natural-science and historical problems."

Part of it was published separately in 1880 in France as Socialism: Utopian and Scientific. An English translation was published in 1892. This work also influenced Materialism and Empirio-criticism by Vladimir Lenin.

In the book, Engels articulated one of the classic definitions of the term political economy: "Political economy, in the widest sense, is the science of the laws governing the production and exchange of the material means of subsistence in human society ... Political economy is therefore essentially a historical science. It deals with material which is historical, that is, constantly changing."

In his biography of Marx, Isaiah Berlin found the most readable section to be that subsequently published separately under the title Socialism: Utopian and Scientific which he described as "the best brief autobiographical appreciation of Marxism by one of its creators. ... Written in Engels's best vein [it] had a decisive influence on both Russian and German Socialism."

This work is also the source of a widely quoted aphorism:  "The state is not abolished, it withers away." Another well-known sentence refers approvingly to Hegel: "To him, freedom is the insight into necessity (die Einsicht in die Notwendigkeit)."

See also
Dialectics of Nature

Notes

External links

 Full HTML text online
 Anti-Dühring. Herr Eugen Dühring’s Revolution in Science, full text published by Progress Publishers in PDF format

1878 books
Marxist works
Works originally published in German periodicals
Books by Friedrich Engels
Historical materialism
Dialectical materialism